Skujene parish is an administrative territorial entity of Cēsis Municipality in the Vidzeme region of Latvia (Prior to 2009, it was part of the former Cēsis District). The administrative center is Skujene.

Towns, villages and settlements of Skujene Parish 
 Ģērķēni
 Kosa
 Māļi
 Pērkoņi
 Sērmūkši
 Skujene
 Vecskujene

See also 
 Sērmūkši Manor

External links 
 

Parishes of Latvia
Cēsis Municipality
Vidzeme